Grand Duke Alexander Mikhailovich of Russia ( Aleksandr Mikhailovich; 13 April 1866 – 26 February 1933) was a dynast of the Russian Empire, a naval officer, an author, explorer, the brother-in-law of Emperor Nicholas II and advisor to him.

Early life
 
Alexander was born in Tiflis, in the Tiflis Governorate of the Russian Empire (present-day Georgia). He was the son of Grand Duke Michael Nikolaevich of Russia, the youngest son of Nicholas I of Russia, and Grand Duchess Olga Feodorovna (Cecilie of Baden). He was mostly known as "Sandro".

He was a naval officer. In his youth, he made a good-will visit to the Japanese Empire on behalf of the Russian Empire and another to the Brazilian Empire. He became a brother-in-law and a close advisor of Tsar Nicholas II.

Together, Alexander and Xenia had seven children:
Princess Irina Alexandrovna (1895–1970)
Prince Andrei Alexandrovich (1897–1981)
Prince Feodor Alexandrovich (1898–1968)
Prince Nikita Alexandrovich (1900–1974)
Prince Dmitri Alexandrovich (1901–1980)
Prince Rostislav Alexandrovich (1902–1978)
Prince Vasili Alexandrovich (1907–1989)

Before the revolution, the Grand Duke liked to spend his vacation in France, particularly Biarritz and the Côte d'Azur, where his older brother, Grand Duke Michael Mikhailovich of Russia had financed in 1908 the construction of the Hôtel Carlton, in Cannes.

Naval career
In 1885 Alexander graduated from the Naval College with the rank of midshipman; he served in the Navy and participated in  voyages. From 1891 he initiated and founded the first edition of the Russian annual directory of Military Fleets, which he edited until 1906. In 1895 he developed a program of strengthening the Russian Navy in the Pacific. Starting in 1896, he taught the Naval Game at the Naval Science Classes in the Naval Academy. Between 1901 and 1902 he acted as the commander of the Black Sea battleship Rostislav, and in 1903 he was appointed a junior flag officer of the Black Sea Fleet. In parallel, between 1901 and 1905 he acted as a chief superintendent and the chairman of several councils related to merchant shipping and ports. At these positions he contributed to the development of commercial shipping, construction and equipment of new ports, the training of merchant mariners, the founding of long-distance shipping lines and the improvement of maritime-trade legislation. During the Russian-Japanese war of 1904–1905 he oversaw the auxiliary cruisers of the Volunteer Fleet. Alexander took part in the development of programs aimed at rebuilding the fleet, brought them to the attention of governments and the public, and avidly supported  the construction of new battleships. In 1909 he was promoted to the rank of vice admiral.

World War I
Alexander played a major role in the creation of Russian military aviation.  He was the initiator of the officer's aviation school near Sevastopol in 1910 and later the chief of the Imperial Russian Air Service during the First World War. From December 1916 Alexander was the Field Inspector General of the Imperial Russian Air Service. At the beginning of 1917 he advocated the formation of a government with the participation of public figures, speaking out against the "responsible ministry".

The Revolution and after
His impact on Nicholas has been both criticized and appreciated. His memoirs document that he openly challenged Empress Alexandra's political influence on her husband but wished that Nicholas had used troops to resist the revolution. He also admitted that he had been brought up to share the anti-Semitic views that he claimed were prevalent in Russia prior to the revolution. His appeal to Nicholas, as his children approached adulthood, to relax the requirement for equal marriage for Romanov dynasts was rejected, and all seven of his children married titled but non-royal Russian aristocrats, but only his daughter obtained permission of Nicholas to do so. When Alexander's eldest son, Andrei Alexandrovich, married at Yalta in the Crimea on 12 June 1918, Nicholas, who had abdicated on 15 March 1917, was a prisoner at Yekaterinburg with his family. They would be executed by the Bolsheviks just over a month later.

Alexander left the Crimea with his eldest son, Prince Andrei Alexandrovich, and his son's new bride, Elisabetta Ruffo di Sant'Antimo, who was pregnant, in December 1918. His wife and mother-in-law, Empress-Dowager Maria Fyodorovna and his sons as well as other Romanovs, were rescued from the Crimea by the British battleship  in 1919.

Alexander lived in Paris and wrote his memoirs. Once a Grand Duke (Farrar & Rinehart 1933) is a source of dynastical and court life in Imperial Russia's last half-century. He also spent a time as guest of future Emperor Ras Tafari. He talks about why he was invited to the Ethiopian Empire in his sequel, Always a Grand Duke. He died in Roquebrune-Cap-Martin, France. He was the last surviving legitimate grandchild of Nicholas I of Russia. He was buried there in Roquebrune. His wife, Xenia, died in Hampton Court Palace in 1960.

While in exile after 1917, he became fascinated with archaeology and conducted a number of successful expeditions.

Freemasonry
Alexander was a "mystical freemason" and spirit, called himself a rosicrucian and philalethes. Was in the masonic "Velikoknyiajeskaia Lodge" (St. Petersburg, after 1907 to 1917), the founder of the "Admiralty Lodge" (St. Petersburg, 1910), who worked on the ritual Philalethes. According to the Encyclopaedia by Serkov, Alexander was a master of the lodge "Karma", who worked in the years 1910–1919 Swedish Rite.

Honours and awards

Ancestry

References

1866 births
1933 deaths
Military personnel from Tbilisi
People from Tiflis Governorate
Russian grand dukes
House of Holstein-Gottorp-Romanov
Members of the State Council (Russian Empire)
Russian anti-communists
Emigrants from the Russian Empire to France
19th-century people from the Russian Empire
20th-century archaeologists
Russian Freemasons
Recipients of the Order of St. Anna, 1st class
Recipients of the Order of Saint Stanislaus (Russian), 1st class
Recipients of the Order of the White Eagle (Russia)
Recipients of the Order of St. Vladimir, 2nd class
Grand Crosses of the Order of Saint Stephen of Hungary
Knights of the Holy Sepulchre